The 2019–20 NEC women's basketball season will begin with practices in October 2019, followed by the start of the 2019–20 NCAA Division I women's basketball season in November. Conference play will start in January 2020 and concluded in March with the 2020 Northeast Conference women's basketball tournament.

Changes from last season
Merrimack College joined the Northeast Conference from Division II Northeast-10 Conference. They are not eligible this year for the NEC tournament.

On October 3, 2018 Long Island University announced that it would combine its two existing athletic programs—NEC member LIU Brooklyn and the Division II program at LIU Post—into a single Division I program under the LIU name. The new LIU program, to be nicknamed Sharks, will maintain LIU Brooklyn's existing memberships in Division I and the NEC.

Head coaches

Note: Stats shown are before the beginning of the season. All numbers are from time at current school.

Preseason

Rankings

() first place votes

Preseason All-NEC team
Source

NEC regular season

Weekly awards
Throughout the regular season, the Northeast Conference offices named player(s) of the week and rookie(s) of the week.

All-NEC honors and awards
Following the regular season, the conference selected outstanding performers based on a poll of league coaches.

Postseason

NEC tournament

In the NEC tournament the top eight teams from the field of eleven participate. The teams are seeded according to their conference records, and when there are similar records between teams, tie-breakers are applied. After the first round, teams are reseeded after each round, with highest remaining seeds receiving home court advantage.

NCAA tournament

See also

2019–20 Northeast Conference men's basketball season

References

External links
NEC website